Truncatellidae, common name the "looping snails", is a family of small amphibious snails, with gills and an operculum, semi-marine gastropod mollusks or micromollusks.

Shell description 

This family of snails have small shells which lose their apical whorls as they continue to grow, giving the shells a truncated and cylindrical appearance.

Subfamilies
The family Truncatellidae consists of two subfamilies (according to the taxonomy of the Gastropoda by Bouchet & Rocroi, 2005):
 subfamily Truncatellinae Gray, 1840
 subfamily Geomelaniinae Kobelt & Möllendorff, 1897

Genera
Genera within the family Truncatellidae include:

Truncatellinae
 Truncatella Risso, 1826 - type genus of the family Truncatellidae

Geomelaniinae
 Geomelania L. Pfeiffer, 1845 - type genus of the subfamily Geomelaniinae

subfamily ?
 †Nystia
 Taheitia Adams, 1863

Habitat 
Snails in this family are found in marine coastal environments, near or just above the high tide line on stones and pebbles, fine sediments and decomposing vegetation.

Life cycle 
The sexes are separate. Fertilized eggs are laid as egg capsules, which are attached to detritus.

References

External links 

 Truncatellidae on Discovery Life